A lizard is a reptile.

Lizard, The Lizard, or Lizards may also refer to:

Places

Australia 

 Lizard Island, an island in the Coral Sea off the Cape York Peninsula
 Lizard Island Airport
 Lizard Point (Queensland), an outcrop of rock in Australia
 Lizard, Queensland, a locality in the Shire of Cook

United Kingdom 

The Lizard, a peninsula in Cornwall, United Kingdom
Lizard (village), a village on The Lizard
Lizard Point, Cornwall, a headland on The Lizard, Cornwall
Lizard complex, the ophiolite geology of The Lizard peninsula

Other places 

Lizard Creek (disambiguation), any one of several streams

Music
 Lizard (album), a 1970 album by King Crimson
 Tenor cornett or lizard, a common musical instrument in the Renaissance and Baroque periods
 The Lizard (album), an album by Saigon Kick
 The Lounge Lizards, a jazz group formed in 1978 by saxophone player John Lurie
 The Lizards, a song by Phish
 Lizard (record label), a Russian record label founded by pop rock singer Dmitry Koldun

Fiction
 Lizard (comics), a Marvel Comics character
 Lizards, alternate name of The Race, fictional aliens in the Worldwar series of stories
 Lizard (short stories), a collection of short stories by Banana Yoshimoto
 Lizard (film), a 2020 Nigerian film
 The Lizard, also known as Marmoulak, a 2004 Iranian comedy film
 "Lizards" (Heroes), the second episode of the second season of the TV show "Heroes"

Other
 Reptilian humanoids, humanoid reptiles from conspiracy theories associated with David Icke and others, popularly known as "Lizards"
 Lizard (camouflage), French military camouflage pattern
 The "Lizard", nickname of Dusty Baker, a former Major League Baseball player and manager
 The "Lizard", nickname of Tony Bloom, a professional poker player
 The constellation Lacerta, known as "The Lizard"
 The Military Organization Lizard Union, a Polish WWII anti-Nazi resistance group
 Weather the Lizard, a nautical term from the 18th century Royal Navy
 Lizards (game)

See also
 Lounge lizard (disambiguation)